Ubungo District (officially known as Ubungo Municipal Council) is one of five districts in Dar es Salaam, Tanzania, the others being Ilala to the South and Kinondoni to the North and Kigamboni across Kivukoni harbor.

Wards 
Ubungo District is subdivided administratively into 9 wards.  The wards are listed below:

 Kimara
 Msigani
 Saranga
 Makuburi
 Ubungo

 Mabibo
 Sinza
 Manzese
 Mburahati

Education
The University of Dar es Salaam in the north east of Ubungo.

Economy
Ubungo hosts the country's second largest indoor shopping mall, the Mlimani City Shopping Mall.

Ubungo Interchange which has been launched in February 2021, has named after the late fallen Chief Secretary, John Kijazi.

Ubungo hosts the offices of the Tanzania Electric Supply Company Limited.

The bus terminal that was formerly in Ubungo Bus Terminal has been relocated to Magufuli Bus Terminal. Construction of the EA Logistics Centre is all set to begin early next year in this location. The area has also been converted to a new Udart bus station as of November 2021, according to a video uploaded on YouTube.

References 

Geography of Dar es Salaam
Populated places in Dar es Salaam Region